Francis Gerald Deayton (2 June 1921 – 17 October 2004) was an Australian rules footballer who played with Melbourne in the Victorian Football League (VFL).

Notes

External links 

Frank Deayton's playing statistics from The VFA Project

1921 births
Australian rules footballers from Victoria (Australia)
Melbourne Football Club players
Oakleigh Football Club players
2004 deaths